Christine Glass is an American singer-songwriter, married to Marc Byrd (of Hammock and Common Children fame).

She has released two solo albums, Human (1997 on Tattoo Records) and Love & Poverty (1999 on Rustproof Records). She formed a duo called GlassByrd with her husband and they released Open Wide This Window in 2003. Their single "Weight of the World" charted on the Billboard Hot Christian Songs and Hot Christian Adult Contemporary charts in 2003.

She has appeared on a number of albums by Hammock, providing background vocals.

Her song "My Love Will Get You Home" is frequently heard on a Chinese drama, Heart of Greed (溏心風暴) and the Israeli horror film, Big Bad Wolves, and is occasionally heard on many others.

External links
Christine Glass on Myspace
Christine Glass at Discogs
Review of "Human" at crossrhythms.co.uk
Review of "Love & Poverty" at jesusfreakhideout.com

Year of birth missing (living people)
American women singer-songwriters
Living people
21st-century American women